The , also called the Kantō Insurrection or the , was a civil war that occurred in the area of Mito Domain in Japan between May 1864 and January 1865. It involved an uprising and terrorist actions against the central power of the Shogunate in favour of the sonnō jōi ("Revere the emperor, expel the barbarians") policy.

Outline
A shogunal pacification force was sent to Mount Tsukuba on 17 June 1864, consisting of 700 Mito soldiers led by Ichikawa, with 3 to 5 cannons and at least 200 firearms, as well as a Tokugawa shogunate force of 3,000 men with over 600 firearms and several cannons. 

As the conflict escalated, on 10 October 1864 at Nakaminato, the shogunate force of 6,700 was defeated by 2000 insurgents, and several shogunal defeats followed.

The insurgents were weakening, however, dwindling to about 1,000. By December 1864 they faced a new force under Tokugawa Yoshinobu (himself born in Mito) numbering over 10,000, which ultimately forced them to surrender. 

The uprising resulted in 1,300 dead on the rebels' side, which suffered vicious repression, including 353 executions and approximately 100 who died in captivity.

Other
Mito and Hikone had been hostile since the Sakurada Gate incident in 1860. Mito and Hikone were reconciled by Tsuruga, the deathplace of Tengutō members, after 110 years of the incident.
Nuclear dense zones of Japan are concentrated near Mito and near Tsuruga, these two places are related by the Tengutō rebellion. Especially, Jōyō (Ōarai, a neighbor of Mito) and Monju (Tsuruga) are two sodium-cooled fast reactors in Japan.

See also

Mito Domain
Tsuruga : deathplace of Tengutō members

Notes

References
 Totman, Conrad. (1980). The Collapse of the Tokugawa Bakufu, 1862–1868 University of Hawaii Press, Honolulu, 

1864 in Japan
1865 in Japan
Conflicts in 1864
Conflicts in 1865
19th-century rebellions
Bakumatsu
Rebellions in Japan
Mito Domain
History of Fukui Prefecture